Narosky is a Slavic habitational surname. Notable people with the name include:
 José Narosky (1930), Argentine notary public and writer
 Tito Narosky (1932), Argentine ornithologist and writer

References 

Polish-language surnames
Polish toponymic surnames